Kanifing (also Kanifeng) is a town in the Gambia, and lies immediately west of the capital city of Banjul. 

The Kanifing Local Government Area has the largest population of any of the administrative districts in Gambia. It includes Serrekunda, the largest urban area in the Gambia, as well as the Atlantic coastal resorts in which most of the region's hotels are to be found.

The head office of Gambia Bird, an airline, was located at the Gambia Bird House in Kanifing.

Sister cities
Kanifing is twinned with:
 Madison, Wisconsin, United States
 , Senegal

External websites
http://kanifing.gm/

References

Populated places in the Gambia
Greater Banjul Area

mk:Канифинг